This is a list of topics related to East Timor. Those interested in the subject can monitor changes to the pages by clicking on Related changes in the sidebar.

East Timor
 East Timor

Buildings and structures in East Timor

Airports in East Timor
 Presidente Nicolau Lobato International Airport formerly known as Comoro Airport, is situated in Dili and 6 kilometres west of Dili city centre. The airport serves as the main international airport for Timor-Leste. Due to the Covid-19 pandemic between 2020-2021, flights into and out of Timor-Leste through Dili international airport were restricted. It has an 1850 m length and 30 m wide runway. Due to the runway length, the maximum size of aircraft capable of landing is B737 equivalent. 
In October 2021, the Asian Development Bank approved a $135 million loan for the expansion of Dili Airport. This project aims to improve facilities at Dili Airport by extending the airport runway to meet international safety standards and constructing a new air traffic control tower (ATCT), taxiways, aprons, and aeronautical ground lighting system support the upgraded runway.

Cities in East Timor
 List of cities in East Timor
 Aileu
 Ainaro
 Atabae
 Balibo
 Baquia
 Baucau
 Bazartete
 Bobonaro
 Buku Mera
 Dare (city)
 Dili
 Ermera
 Fatolulic
 Fohorern
 Gleno
 Hotudo
 Laga (East Timor)
 Liquiçá
 Lolotoe
 Lospalos
 Maliana
 Manatuto
 Maubara
 Metinaro
 Pante Macassar
 Passabe
 Quelicai
 Same (East Timor)
 Suai
 Tilomar
 Venilale
 Viqueque
 Zumalai

Communications in East Timor
 Communications in East Timor
 .tl
 .tp

East Timorese culture
 Culture of East Timor
 Arte Moris
 Bibi Bulak
 Coat of arms of East Timor
 Flag of East Timor

Languages of East Timor
 Languages of East Timor
 Bunak
 Fataluku language
 Makalero
 Makasae
 Mambai
 Tetum language
 Tocodede
 Waimoa language
 Wetarese

East Timorese music
 Music of East Timor

Districts of East Timor
 Districts of East Timor
 Aileu District
 Ainaro District
 Baucau District
 Bobonaro District
 Cova Lima District
 Dili District
 Ermera District
 Lautém District
 Liquiçá District
 Manatuto District
 Manufahi District
 Oecusse District
 Viqueque District

Economy of East Timor
 Economy of East Timor
 East Timor centavo coins
 Portuguese Timorese pataca

Companies of East Timor

Trade unions of East Timor
 East Timor Trade Union Confederation

Education in East Timor
 Arte Moris
 Bibi Bulak
 Universidade Nacional de Timor-Leste
 Universidade Dili

Schools in East Timor
 St. Joseph's High School, East Timor

Environment of East Timor

Conservation in East Timor

See also Environmental laws fail to protect endangered fauna in East Timor

Geography of East Timor
 Geography of East Timor
 Demographics of East Timor
 ISO 3166-2:TL
 Ombai Strait
 Subdistricts of East Timor
 Timor
 Timor Sea
 Wetar Strait

Hiking in East Timor
 Mount Ramelau
 East Timor Traverse

Islands of East Timor
 Atauro Island
 Jaco Island
 Sunda Islands

Maps of East Timor
 Maps of East Timor

Mountains of East Timor
 Mount Ramelau

National parks of East Timor
 Nino Konis Santana National Park

Government of East Timor
 East Timor solidarity movement
 Timor Leste Defence Force
 National Parliament of East Timor
 President of East Timor
 Prime Minister of East Timor
 United Nations Office in Timor Leste

Foreign relations of East Timor
 Foreign relations of East Timor
 List of Ambassadors from New Zealand to Timor-Leste
 Timorese diplomatic missions
 United Nations Office in Timor Leste

History of East Timor
 History of East Timor
 1959 Viqueque Rebellion
 2006 East Timor crisis
 Aitarak
 Balibo Five
 Battle of Timor (1942-43)
 Besi Merah Putih
 Commission for Reception, Truth and Reconciliation in East Timor
 Dili massacre
 Tomé Diogo
 East Timor solidarity movement
 Indonesian invasion of East Timor
 INTERFET
 Laksaur
 Liquiçá Church Massacre
 Operation Astute
 Portuguese Timor
 Portuguese Timorese escudo
 Portuguese Timorese pataca
 Pro-Indonesia militia
 Second Special Panel
 Sparrow Force
 Suai Church Massacre
 Timor Gap Treaty
 UN Administrator for East Timor
 United Nations Mission of Support to East Timor
 United Nations Transitional Administration in East Timor

Elections in East Timor
 Elections in East Timor

Organisations based in East Timor
 Associação dos Escuteiros de Timor Lorosae

Political parties in East Timor
 List of political parties in East Timor
 Association of Timorese Heroes
 Christian Democratic Party (East Timor)
 Christian Democratic Party of Timor
 Democratic Party (East Timor)
 Liberal Party (East Timor)
 People's Party of Timor
 Fretilin
 Social Democratic Party (East Timor)
 Socialist Party of Timor
 Timorese Democratic Union
 Timorese Nationalist Party
 Timorese Social Democratic Association

East Timorese people
 List of East Timorese people
 Mari Alkatiri
 Carlos Filipe Ximenes Belo
 Martinho da Costa Lopes
 Gil da Cruz Trindade
 Eurico Guterres
 Alfredo Reinado
 Kirsty Sword Gusmão

East Timorese politicians
 Mari Alkatiri
 Francisco Xavier do Amaral
 Xanana Gusmão
 Nicolau dos Reis Lobato
 Anna Pessoa Pinto
 President of East Timor
 Prime Minister of East Timor
 José Ramos-Horta
 Aniceto Guterres Lopes
 Maria Angelina Lopes Sarmento
 Luis Roberto da Silva

East Timorese writers

East Timorese poets
 Afonso Busa Metan

Politics of East Timor
 Politics of East Timor
 Mário Lemos Pires
 National Parliament of East Timor

Religion in East Timor
 Roman Catholicism in East Timor

East Timorese society
 Associação dos Escuteiros de Timor Lorosae
 Demographics of East Timor
 Galoli
 Mambai
 Pátria

Sport in East Timor
 Sport in East Timor
 IOA

East Timorese sports teams
 East Timor national football team

East Timorese sportspeople

East Timorese athletes
 Gil da Cruz Trindade

Football in East Timor
 East Timor national football team
 Federaçao Futebol Timor-Leste

Football venues in East Timor
 National Stadium (East Timor)

Recreation in East Timor
 Diving in East Timor

Timor-Leste at the Olympics
 Timor-Leste at the 2004 Summer Olympics

Transport in East Timor

Airlines of East Timor
 Timor Air

See also
 Lists of country-related topics - similar lists for other countries